The Kyiv Municipal Academic Opera and Ballet Theatre for Children and Youth is a theatrical production company in Kyiv, Ukraine. It was founded in 1982 in the premises of the Slavutych Theatre, which was previously called the "Kharchovyk Palace" as during the postwar era it had been assigned for the cultural use of workers in the food industry.

External links
Official website
Kyiv Municipal Academy Opera and Ballet Theatre for Children and Youth on worldwalk.info

Theatres in Kyiv
1985 establishments in Ukraine